Luçon Cathedral (French: Cathédrale Notre-Dame-de-l'Assomption de Luçon) is a Roman Catholic church located in Luçon in the Vendée, France. The cathedral is a national monument.

It is the seat of the Bishop of Luçon.

Sources
 Catholic Encyclopedia: Luçon

External links

 Photographs:  ,

Roman Catholic cathedrals in France
Churches in Vendée